Eberhard Preußner (22 May 1899 – 15 August 1964) was a German music educator.

Life 
Born in Słupsk, Preußner was the second of three children of Oskar and Jenny Preußner. He spent his childhood and youth in Stettin, where his father was director of the Bismarck-Oberrealschule there. From 1916 to 1918, he served as a soldier in the First World War. After the war, he studied at the Universität der Künste Berlin and at the Humboldt-Universität zu Berlin, where he received his doctorate in 1924 with the dissertation Die Methodik im Schulgesang der evangelischen Lateinschulen des 17. Jahrhunderts. He dedicated himself to music education. In 1928, he became editor of the journal Die Musik and worked until 1934 with Leo Kestenberg at the Berlin Central Institute for Education and Teaching, and from 1930–1944, was editor of the music journal Die Musikpflege.

After the seizure of power by the Nazis, he was a member of the Reichsmusikkammer. In 1939, Preußner went to the Mozarteum in Salzburg, where he became lecturer and managing director and headed the city's concert office. In 1945, he first worked at the Salzburg Volkshochschule, but continued to teach as a lecturer in music history and music education at the Mozarteum, where he was appointed as an extraordinary professor in 1949 after he had accepted Austrian citizenship. In addition to several guest professorships in the United States, Preußner became a member of the board of directors of the 1960 Salzburg Festival.

He received numerous awards, such as the Decoration of Honour for Services to the Republic of Austria in 1957 and the Austrian Decoration for Science and Art in 1964.

Preußner was the godfather of the cellist Wolfgang Boettcher, who later married his niece Regine Vollmar.

Preußner died in Munich aged 75.

Publications 
 Musikgeschichte des Abendlandes Eine Betrachtung f.d. Musikliebhaber.
 Allgemeine Pädagogik und Musikpädagogik. Leipzig 1929.
 Die musikalischen Reisen des Herrn v. Uffenbach. Reisetagebuch 1712–1716. Kassel und Basel 1949.
 Allgemeine Musikerziehung. Heidelberg 1959.
 Wie studiere ich Musik? Heidelberg 1962.

Further reading 
 Ilse Gudden-Lüddeke: Eberhard Preußner, Musikpädagoge. In Pommersches Heimatbuch 2009. Pommersche Landsmannschaft, Lübeck 2008, .
 Thomas Hochradner, Michaela Schwarzbauer (ed.): Eberhard Preußner. Musikhistoriker, Musikpädagoge, Präsident. Hollitzer Wissenschaftsverlag, Vienna 2011, .
Jarosław Chacinski: Leo Kestenberg and Eberhard Preussner from the perspective of Polish culture pedagogy and music education – similarities, differences and inspirations. In Jarosław Chaciński, Friedhelm Brusniak (ed.): Music Education in continuity and breakthrough: historical prospects and current references in a European context. Slupsk 2016, .

References

External links 
 

German music educators
Academic staff of Mozarteum University Salzburg
Recipients of the Austrian Cross of Honour for Science and Art
1899 births
1964 deaths
People from Słupsk